Doriopsilla espinosai is a species of dorid nudibranch, a colourful sea slug, a shell-less marine gastropod mollusc in the family Dendrodorididae.

Distribution
This species was described from Cuba, Caribbean Sea. It has been reported from the Bahamas.

References

Dendrodorididae
Gastropods described in 1998